Barry McArthur (born 4 May 1947) is an English former professional footballer who played as a striker in the Football League for Nottingham Forest, Barrow and York City, and in non-League football for Matlock Town.

McArthur was the first player to come on as a substitute for Nottingham Forest in a league match on 4 September 1965 in the 2–1 away win against Leeds United when Colin Addison was injured.

Career statistics

References

1947 births
Living people
Footballers from Nottingham
English footballers
Association football forwards
Nottingham Forest F.C. players
Barrow A.F.C. players
York City F.C. players
Matlock Town F.C. players
English Football League players